Pavel Valerievich Priluchny (born 5 November 1987) is a Kazakhstani-born Russian actor of theater and cinema, TV host, best known for his roles in the television series Silver Spoon and The Life and Adventures of Mishka Yaponchik

Biography

Early years and education
Pavel Priluchny was born in Chimkent, Chimkent Oblast, Kazakh SSR, Soviet Union (now Kazakhstan). His mother was a choreographer and his father a boxing trainer. Pavel spent his childhood and teenage years doing choreography and boxing. He studied at a theater school in Novosibirsk, and performed at the youth theater "Globus".

Pavel moved to Moldova when he was seventeen. He entered the Russian Academy of Theatre Arts, but because of a mistake in the paper work, his name was not on the list of the candidates. Instead of waiting for the mix-up to be corrected, he decided to enter the Moscow Art Theater School (course of Konstantin Raikin. He studied there for only two years. Priluchny later finished his education in 2010 at GITIS (course of Sergei Golomazov).

Immediately after graduation, he was accepted into the troupe of the Moscow Drama Theater in Malaya Bronnaya. Then he worked at the Moscow Pushkin Drama Theatre and at the Bulgakov Theater (Bulgakov House).

Career
He received his first recognition after the release of the action movie directed by Pavel Sanayev Hooked on the Game (2009), where he played the role of "Doc". In early 2010, starred in the sequel "Hooked on the Game 2. A New Level."

In 2014 he starred in the television series Silver Spoon in the role of Igor Sokolovsky, a golden boy who unexpectedly has to work in the police.

In 2012, he co-starred in season one of Freud’s Method.

From July 2 to August 19, 2011 Pavel participated in the program "A Couple of Pinochets" on the NTV channel.

In the summer of 2011, he appeared in the music video "Everything is Decided" by Elvira T.

Since 2017 he is the host of entertainment show "Kings of Plywood" on the First Channel.

Personal life
In 2009 he was romantically involved with Hollywood actress Nikki Reed.

Pavel married Latvian actress Agata Muceniece in 2011. He and his wife have a son Timofey (born 2013), have a daughter Mia (born 2016), in Moscow, Russia.

In February 2020 Agata filed for divorce and accused Pavel in domestic violence.

Selected filmography

References

External links
 

1987 births
Living people
Russian male film actors
Russian male television actors
Russian male stage actors
21st-century Russian male actors
Anti-Ukrainian sentiment in Russia
Male actors from Moscow
Russian theatre directors
Russian film directors
Russian television presenters